London and Blenheim Estates Ltd v Ladbroke Retail Parks Ltd [1993] 4 All ER 157 is an English land law case, concerning easements. It persuasively confirmed for one of the first times, obiter, that parking a car on land on its own could be the appropriate subject matter for an express easement.  It established that an arrangement for a future extension of easement rights over specific other land would require a specific parcel of dominant land too. Simply agreeing that wherever any dominant land is extended (to an incertain extent) the easement on the servient land will be extended (even to a certain degree) is insufficient.

Facts
The Leicestershire branch of the Co-op sold part of its land to London and Blenheim ("L&B") but reserving the right to park cars on the land (i.e. reserving of rights by the Co-op). The agreement provided that if L&B were to acquire "more land" or words to that effect, it should tell the Co-op in advance so Co-op could benefit from more parking rights on a pre-agreed basis.

Then the Co-op sold its land to Ladbroke.

L&B argued it could serve notice on Ladbroke in place of Co-op (and attempted to do so), L&B having acquired new land; secondly it denied it now owned further servient land to accommodate Ladbroke's claimed interests under the contract with Co-op. In its view Ladbroke did not have a further easement (rights to bind L&B to grant more parking) and could not have an easement in the first place.  Ladbroke countered that even L&B were bound by the agreement as it expressly created easements; the fact that its future enhanced parking rights related to uncertain land (therefore in specie) was not an invalid concept in law.

Judgment

High Court
Judge Paul Baker QC held the following.

Court of Appeal
Peter Gibson LJ gave the leading judgment, he agreed that L&B could not claim a car parking right for additional land, because the alleged dominant tenement was not adequately identified. The reason why there must be a dominant tenement before there can be a grant is because certainty is of prime importance, as said in Ashburn Anstalt v Arnold, a case which concerned a proposed expensive new development in South Kensington.

See also

English land law
English trusts law
English property law

References

English land case law
1993 in case law
1993 in British law
Court of Appeal (England and Wales) cases